Karim Kandi may refer to:
 Karim Kandi, Kurdistan